Martha "Maggie" Bowen (born 1980) is a retired American swimmer who won two medals in individual medley events at the 2001 World Aquatics Championships.

In 2000, she narrowly missed Olympic qualification by finishing third in the 200 m medley in the US trials. She won several National Collegiate Athletic Association titles in medley and freestyle events in 2001–2003.

References

1980 births
Living people
Swimmers from Mississippi
American female medley swimmers
Sportspeople from Jackson, Mississippi
Swimmers at the 1999 Pan American Games
American sportswomen
World Aquatics Championships medalists in swimming
Pan American Games silver medalists for the United States
Pan American Games medalists in swimming
Medalists at the 1999 Pan American Games
21st-century American women